VPB-198 was a Patrol Bombing Squadron of the U.S. Navy. The squadron was established as Bombing Squadron 198 (VB-198) on 12 September 1944, redesignated Patrol Bombing Squadron 198 (VPB-198) on 1 October 1944 and disestablished on 1 April 1946.

Operational history
12 September 1944: VB-198 was established at NAS Moffett Field, California, under the operational control of FAW-8, as an Operational Training Unit flying the PV-1 Ventura. The mission of the squadron was to train and supply pilots and crews for all operational squadrons in the Pacific. Formerly, entire squadrons had been rotated back to the U.S. upon relief, but the new Integrated Aeronautics Program called for rotation of personnel and aircraft only. The first four crews to complete the training program departed on 20 November to relieve combat zone personnel who had completed their tours. On the average, 26 flight crews were undergoing training in different phases of the syllabus.
April 1945: The original 20 war-weary PV-1 Venturas used by the squadron for training were replaced by new PV-2 Harpoons.
1 April 1946: VPB-198 was disestablished at NAS Moffett Field.

Commanding officers
 Lieutenant Marion D. Trewhitt: 12 September 1944 
 Lieutenant Commander Alexander B Dusenberry: 5 January 1945
 LCdr. Lloyd F. Jakeman: 12 January 1945

Aircraft assignments
The squadron was assigned the following aircraft, effective on the dates shown:
 PV-1 - September 1944
 PV-2 - April 1945

Home port assignments
The squadron was assigned to these home ports, effective on the dates shown:
 NAS Moffett Field, California - 12 September 1944

See also

 Maritime patrol aircraft
 List of inactive United States Navy aircraft squadrons
 List of United States Navy aircraft squadrons
 List of squadrons in the Dictionary of American Naval Aviation Squadrons
 History of the United States Navy

References

Patrol squadrons of the United States Navy
Wikipedia articles incorporating text from the Dictionary of American Naval Aviation Squadrons